Luis López de Solís, O.S.A. (1534 – July 5, 1606) was a Roman Catholic prelate who served as the Bishop of La Plata o Charcas (1605–1606) and the Bishop of Quito (1592–1605).

Biography
Luis López de Solís was born in Salamanca, Spain and ordained a priest in the Order of Saint Augustine in 1558. On September 7, 1592, he was appointed by the King of Spain and confirmed by Pope Clement VIII as Bishop of Quito. On April 3, 1594, he was consecrated bishop by Toribio Alfonso de Mogrovejo, Archbishop of Lima. On July 18, 1605, he was appointed by the King of Spain and confirmed by Pope Clement VIII as Bishop of La Plata o Charcas. He served as Bishop of La Plata o Charcas until his death on July 5, 1606.

While bishop, he was the principal consecrator of Fernando Trexo y Senabria, Bishop of Córdoba.

References

External links and additional sources
 (for Chronology of Bishops) 
 (for Chronology of Bishops) 
 (for Chronology of Bishops) 
 (for Chronology of Bishops) 

1534 births
1606 deaths
People from Salamanca
Bishops appointed by Pope Clement VIII
Augustinian bishops
University of Salamanca alumni
16th-century Roman Catholic bishops in Ecuador
17th-century Roman Catholic bishops in Ecuador
17th-century Roman Catholic bishops in Bolivia
Roman Catholic bishops of Quito
Roman Catholic bishops of Sucre